Abrahamsberg is a station on the Green line of the Stockholm metro. It is located on the border between the districts of Ulvsunda and Abrahamsberg, which are part of the borough of Bromma in the west of the city of Stockholm. The station is above ground and has a single island platform, with access from underpass carrying Abrahamsbergsvägen under the line.

The station lies on the route of a line known as the  that formerly linked Alvik and Islandstorget. The Ängbybanan was designed and built for use by the future metro, but was operated from 1944 as part of line 11 of the Stockholm tramway. Abrahamsberg station was inaugurated as part of the metro on 26 October 1952 with the conversion of the Ängbybanan and its extension to form the metro line between Hötorget and Vällingby.

As part of Art in the Stockholm metro project, this station features tiling in both the ticket hall and stairwell in a grey scale.

Gallery

References

External links
Images of Abrahamsberg

Green line (Stockholm metro) stations
Railway stations opened in 1952